Paul Alwin Mittasch (sorbian: Pawoł Alwin Mitaš) (born 27 December 1869 in Großdehsa/Dažin, today to Löbau, Germany; died 4 June 1953 in Heidelberg, Germany) was a German chemist and scientific historian of Sorbian descent. He is well known by his pioneering and systematic research in the development of catalysts for the industrial ammonia synthesis using the Haber–Bosch process.

Life 
Alwin Mittasch was born in 1869 as a son of a teacher in the Sorbian village Großdehsa|Großdehsa/Dažin in Germany. He had a brother and three sisters. He attended elementary school in his home village of Großdehsa. Then he changed to a boarding school in Bautzen, where in 1889 the teacher seminar finished. Then he began, like his father, a career as a teacher in which he worked as an assistant teacher on the elementary school. In 1892 he moved to Leipzig and began there as a sideline in university of Leipzig with the study of numerous fields to which history, philosophy, psychology counted, however, also the natural sciences. He concentrated on chemistry and in 1901 he received a doctorate in the field on chemistry in the department from Wilhelm Ostwald in the department of the Pysikochemie. Max Bodenstein became his supervisor. In his thesis dealt Mittasch with Nickelcarbonylen. In spite of full-time employment as a teacher he finished this after one and a half years with summa cum laude. Use found the basic results of this work among other things with the development of the Mond-Langer-Carbonylverfahrens into the nickel production. Still decades later his results of the research were pulled by experts to rate. However, still he still intensely dealt with the philosophy. A habilitation could not aim at Mittasch, because he had to show no Abitur. Therefore, he smashed the way into the industry. First it nailed up him after mountain Stol near Aachen as an analytic chemist in AG for mining, manufacture of lead and zinc manufacture. A place followed as an assistant of Carl Bosch as well as the management of a research lab of the BASF. After he entered by the untimely death of his oldest son Heinz Mittasch in 1932 early into the retirement, he resettled to Heidelberg and devoted himself to writing, music, and gardening. Mittasch was not a political person. Though in 1933 he probably gave his vote for the national socialism, however, never was an ideological follower. In 1953 Alwin Mittasch died in Heidelberg. He was survived by his wife Dora Martha Mittasch (née Jäger) and his younger son Helmut Mittasch.

Work 
Mittasch's career began first in 1903 in Stolberg (Rhineland) as a manufacturer of lead and zinc. After a short time he was promoted to a leading position in metallurgical engineering. However, after only one year he changed on recommendation of his university supervisor to the BASF where he took up his activity as an assistant to Carl Bosch. Besides that work, he also took part in the attempts with which nitrogen about Metallnitride as well as Metallcyanide should be fixed. In 1909 Mittasch began production on the base from Eisenoxid in whose result approx. 20,000 attempts were carried out for the optimization with the systematic search for a catalyst to ammonia. The found catalyst (iron (II/III) oxide Fe3O4, K2O, CaO, Al2O3 and SiO2) allowed the large-scale technical ammoniated synthesis and is still in use, nearly unchanged, to this day. By his great success Mittasch became 1918 research leaders of the then newly-founded ammoniated laboratory of the BASF. Not only this start of the efficient catalyst to ammoniated production decreases to Mittasch but also the catalytic ammoniated oxidation to the nitric acid production, the high-pressure methanol synthesis (together with Matthias Pier in 1923) with mixing oxide catalysts (Zn(II) oxide and Chromium(III) oxide), as well as the Hochdruckcarbonylprozesse to the production of the purest metals such as nickel. The results of his works are held on in 85 patents which he announced mostly with his employees. For his knowledge and his engagement he received numerous honours for his works, including the honorary doctorate from the universities TH Munich and LwH Berlin, as well as an appointment as professor by the government of Baden-Wurttemberg. Alwin Mittasch awards to honour the DECHEMA regularly the Alwin Mittasch price (early Alwin Mittasch medallion) for prominent achievements in the area of the catalysis research.

After retiring from his career as a chemist, he wrote a lot about the history of chemistry as well as about the philosophy of the natural sciences, for which he received recognition from high-ranking people such as Theodor Heuss. In 1944 he started to write the Chronicle of my life.

Works 
 Chemische Dynamik des Nickelkohlenoxyds (Dissertation), Zeitschrift für physikalische Chemie, 1902, 40, 1–88
 Von Davy und Döbereiner bis Deacon. Ein halbes Jahrhundert Grenzflächenkatalyse, 1932 (mit E. Theis)
 Kurze Geschichte der Katalyse in Praxis und Theorie, 1939
 Lebensprobleme und Katalyse (1947)
 Von der Chemie zur Philosophie. Ausgewählte Schriften und Vorträge, 1948 (mit Autobibliographie)
 Geschichte der Ammoniaksynthese, Verlag Chemie, Weinheim, 1951, 196 Seiten
 Salpetersäure aus Ammoniak, 1953
 Erlösung und Vollendung. Gedanken über die letzten Fragen, 1953

Honour 
 Alwin Mittasch street (Germany, BASF)
 Alwin Mittasch place in Ludwigshafen (Germany)
 Lending of the honorary doctorate of the universities TH Munich and LwH Berlin
 Appointment the professor by Baden-Württembergsche government in 1949

References

 
 Wunder der Katalyse, Die Rheinpfalz, 11. März 1950
 Alwin Mittasch, Chemische Berichte, 1957,90, S. XLI-LIV (mit Bibliographie)
 A. von Nagel, Alwin Mittasch, in: Ludwigshafener Chemiker, 1958, 137-170
 R. Oesper, Alwin Mittasch, Journal for Chemical Education, 1948, v. 25, p. 531-532
 E. Farber, "From Chemistry to Philosophy: the Way of Alwin Mittasch", Chymia, 1966, v. 11, 157-178
 ABC Geschichte der Chemie, VEB Deutscher Verlag für Grundstoffindustrie, Leipzig 1989,

External links 

 
 Alwin Mittasch-Preis
 http://www.personenlexikon.net/d/mittasch-paul-alwin/mittasch-paul-alwin.htm
 http://www.leo-bw.de/web/guest/detail/-/Detail/details/PERSON/kgl_biographien/117063371/biografie
 http://www.kipnis.de/index.php?option=com_content&task=view&id=83&Itemid=26

1869 births
1953 deaths
People from Löbau
People from the Kingdom of Saxony
20th-century German chemists
Leipzig University alumni
German people of Sorbian descent